Dai Yunqiang (born 20 July 1990) is a Chinese Paralympic athlete. He won the silver medal in the men's 800 metres T54 event at the 2020 Summer Paralympics held in Tokyo, Japan. He also won the bronze medal in the men's 400 metres T54 event.

He also competed in the men's 1500 metres T54, men's 5000 metres T54 and men's marathon T54 events.

References

External links
 

Living people
1990 births
Athletes from Qingdao
Paralympic medalists in athletics (track and field)
Athletes (track and field) at the 2020 Summer Paralympics
Medalists at the 2020 Summer Paralympics
Paralympic silver medalists for China
Paralympic bronze medalists for China
Paralympic athletes of China
21st-century Chinese people